Teulon is a town located approximately 59 kilometres north of Winnipeg, Manitoba, Canada, on Provincial Trunk Highway 7. Located between Stonewall and Gimli, Teulon is commonly referred to as "The Gateway to the Interlake". Teulon is surrounded by the Rural Municipality of Rockwood.

History 
Teulon was founded in 1919, as a settlement for immigrant farmers, by Charles C. Castle, and was affectionately named after his wife's maiden name of "Teulon". Teulon soon became a village, and then became a town in 1997.

Demographics 

Education

Teulon is situated in the South Interlake school division [no.21] and is served by two schools: 
Teulon Elementary School teaches kindergarten to grade 6 students
Teulon Collegiate Institute teaches grade 7 to grade 12

Government

Municipal
Teulon is represented by a Head of Council (Mayor), a Deputy Mayor, and 3 councillors. The current incumbents of the positions are:
 Anna Pazdzierski- Mayor
 Cherise Griffin- Deputy Mayor
 Angela Green- Councillor
 Todd Campbell- Councillor
 Robin Nishibati- Councillor

Former mayors

In October 2019 the Teulon Council lost three of its members and faces a by-election in those ridings.

Provincial
Teulon is located in the Riding of Lakeside of Legislative Assembly of Manitoba and is currently represented by Ralph Eichler of the Progressive Conservative Party of Manitoba.

Federal
Teulon is located in the Selkirk—Interlake electoral district with one Member of Parliament (MP). The district's current MP is James Bezan (Teulon) of the Conservative Party of Canada.

The Winnipeg-Interlake division of the Senate is represented by Janis Johnson who was appointed by Brian Mulroney, and is a member of the Conservative Party of Canada.

Attractions

Features
Teulon's features include the Teulon Golf & Country Club, Green Acres Park & Campground, Teulon Curling Club, Teulon Rockwood Arena, Teulon Rockwood Centennial Centre, South Interlake Regional Library, and the Teulon and District Museum.

A two-room motel and the Teulon Motor Hotel & Bar are available for visitors.

Summer
Teulon has been known for its Truck & Tractor Pull, along with the Demolition Derby, at the rodeo grounds contained within Green Acres Park. The contest brings out competitors from all over the county.

Teulon Rodeo is also held at the end of August every year, featuring a full heartland rodeo schedule, chariot races, and other attractions.

A short drive to Stonewall's "Quarry Days," Winnipeg Beach's "Boardwalk Days," and Gimli's "Icelandic Festival," visitors of Teulon are able to take in many stops of the Manitoba traveling carnival "Wonder Shows", as well as the local version known as "Teulon Dayz".

Also nearby are Kinsmen Lake, Lake Winnipeg, and Norris Lake.

Winter
Annually, the Town of Teulon holds a Santa Claus parade started by Gloria Joy Anderson, most often followed by a bonspiel. Volunteers create floats, decorating their vehicles and tractors, and toss candy to guests.

Media

Radio
CJ107.5 FM is The Voice of The Interlake featuring Local News, Weather, and events and plays today's Country, Classic Country, Pop, Classic Rock, Oldies and more.

Newspaper
Local newspapers of Teulon include the Stonewall Teulon Tribune, the Stonewall Argus & Teulon Times and the Interlake Spectator.

In film
In 2007, Teulon was the film location for The Haunting in Connecticut starring Virginia Madsen and Elias Koteas. The film premiered on March 27, 2009.

References

External links

 
Towns in Manitoba